Avery A. Skinner (born April 25, 1999) is an American professional volleyball player who plays as an outside hitter. In the 2022–2023 season, she will play for French team Béziers Volley in the French A League.

Personal life

Skinner is from Katy, Texas. In addition to playing volleyball, she was tap, ballet, and musical theater dancer before deciding at age 13 to focus solely on volleyball. Skinner played school volleyball for HCYA and she helped the team win state championships in 2015 and 2016. She also played club volleyball for Houston’s Skyline. She considered playing volleyball for Baylor, Iowa State, and Texas A&M but ultimately settled on Kentucky as she wanted to see what life was like outside of Texas.

Skinner is the daughter of Brian Skinner, who was a star basketball player at Baylor and played in the NBA for 14 years. Her sister, Madi, played volleyball with her at Kentucky.

Career

College
Skinner played college volleyball for a total of five years, as she opted to use the extra year of eligibility granted by the NCAA due to the COVID-19 pandemic.

From 2017–2020, she played for the Kentucky Wildcats. As a freshman in 2017, she finished second on the team with 362 kills and was named to the SEC All-Freshman Team. In 2019, plagued by a knee injury, she only played in nine matches. However, she was able to return back to full strength in 2020 and credited the extra time off due to the COVID-19 quarantines that were in place at the time allowing her more time to rehabilitate her injuries. As a result of her strong senior season, she was named an AVCA First Team All-American after leading Kentucky to its first ever NCAA championship title in the 2020 NCAA Tournament. She was named on the NCAA Final Four All-Tournament Team. She graduated from Kentucky with two degrees in interdisciplinary early childhood education and communication studies and disorders.

She opted to play her extra year of eligibility as a graduate transfer for the Baylor Bears. She finished the season as an Honorable Mention All-American and had the second-most kills on the team with 355 in her 101 sets played, averaging 3.51 kills per set, had 255 digs and 49 blocks. She was named a finalist for the NCAA Women of the Year.

Professional clubs

  Béziers Volley (2022–)

Skinner signed her first professional volleyball contract with Béziers Volley in June 2022 and will play for the team in the 2022–2023 season.

Awards and honors

College
The following are the awards Skinner won during her collegiate career:

2021 All-Big 12 First Team (unanimous)
2021 AVCA All-America - Honorable Mention
2020 AVCA All-America First Team
2020 All-SEC First Team
2017 All-SEC Freshman Team

International

2022 Pan American Cup – “Best Outside Hitter”
2022 Pan American Cup – “Best Scorer”

References

1999 births
Living people
People from Katy, Texas
Outside hitters
American women's volleyball players
Baylor Bears women's volleyball players
Kentucky Wildcats women's volleyball players
University of Kentucky alumni
American expatriate sportspeople in France
Expatriate volleyball players in France